KVPI-FM (92.5 FM, "Classic Hits 92.5") is a radio station airing a classic hits format, licensed to Ville Platte, Louisiana.  The station is owned by Ville Platte Broadcasting Co., Inc.

References

External links
 KVPI-FM's official website

Classic hits radio stations in the United States
Radio stations in Louisiana